A location-based firearm is a gun that uses electronic technologies such as geofencing to restrict its firing to authorized locations, thereby allowing its use for protecting life and property in those locations while preventing its use in other locations for crimes such as robberies, drive-by shootings, assassinations, and massacres.

History 
The first locationized gun was invented by John Martin in 1984.   Although locationized guns could prevent much crime and accompanying deaths and injuries, they have not been commercially developed.  An important reason for that is because legislated restrictions would be required for conventional guns, and those restrictions would be difficult to pass in some markets.

Operating principles, advantages, and technologies 
The main advantage of locationized guns is that they can satisfy the right to possess arms for defense of homes and businesses while being useless for many crimes that can be committed away from those homes and businesses.

Other advantages of locationized guns depend on them having electronic circuitry and electronic control over firing.  Those technologies make it relatively easy to design them to communicate with a cellular or other communication system to provide information or to be externally prevented from firing regardless of location.

Using GPS asset tracking technology can allow a locationized gun to transmit a message through a cellular network to its owner if the gun is removed from its normal location.  GPS tracking could then allow its location to be known by its owner and/or law enforcement to assist in recovery of the gun.

Communications can allow police agencies to learn that a locationized gun is or was at a location of interest, thereby facilitating crime solving or allowing precautions to be taken before arriving at the location. Police agencies can also be automatically notified with information about when and where a locationized gun has been fired. Most importantly, police agencies would be able to prevent firing of the gun in the case of its theft, a police raid, shootout, threatened suicide, restraining order, etc.

Limited firing time: Early technology 
A locationized gun of this type cannot be fired unless it has remained motionless for a relatively long time, e. g. 24 hours.  Following that time period, there is only a relatively short time period that it can be fired after being picked up for use, e. g. 5 minutes.  After its firing time period expires, it must undergo its motionless period again to allow firing.  Consequently, the usefulness of this gun is restricted to locations relatively close to where it is kept, e.g. its owner's property.  A demonstration model having timing and movement sensing circuitry was produced in 1989.

Restricted area of enabling signal reception: Later technologies 
This type of locationized gun cannot be fired unless it is located within the range of a signal that enables firing of the gun.  That signal is transmitted from a permanently or temporarily fixed location either by conductive cable or by wireless broadcast throughout the area where firing of the gun is allowed. Cable length or reception distance determines the area where firing is possible.  A temporarily fixed transmitting location can be a portable base station that must remain motionless for a relatively long time period, e. g. 24 hours, before its signal transmitting begins.

Triangulation and memory of allowable firing locations: Latest technologies 
A locationized gun of this type uses a system of radio frequency triangulation such as GPS or cell phone signals to determine its location.  Firing is then allowed only if the gun's location is electronically determined to be within the area stored in memory of where its firing is allowed, such as a home, business, or hunting area.

See also
Smart gun
Sentry gun

References 

Firearms
Geographic position